The 1966 Soviet football championship was the 34th seasons of competitive football in the Soviet Union and the 28th among teams of sports societies and factories. Dinamo Kiev won the championship becoming the Soviet domestic champions for the second time.

Honours

Notes = Number in parentheses is the times that club has won that honour. * indicates new record for competition

Soviet Union football championship

Class A First Group

Class A Second Group finals

For places 1-3
 [Oct 25 – Nov 16]

For places 4-6
 [Oct 29 – Nov 14]

Class B

Russian Federation finals

Final group
 [Nov 5–13, Orjonikidze]

Ukraine (playoffs)

For places 1-2
 Dinamo Khmelnitskiy          0-0 1-1 Avangard Zholtyye Vody
Replay
 [Nov 25, Kiev] 
 Avangard Zholtyye Vody       2-1  Dinamo Khmelnitskiy

Union republics finals
 [Oct 23–30, Tkibuli]

Central Asia and Kazakhstan

Top goalscorers

Class A First Group
Ilia Datunashvili (Dinamo Tbilisi) – 20 goals

References

External links
 1966 Soviet football championship. RSSSF